Uzbekistan has been participating at the Deaflympics since 1997.
Uzbekistan won its first Deaflympic medal in the 2009 Summer Deaflympics for Taekwondo, which is also their only medal in Deaflympics history.

Medals

Source:

Medals by Summer Games

Medals by Winter Games

References 

Nations at the Deaflympics
Deaf culture in Uzbekistan